The following people are authors of writings on political subjects:

See also 
Lists of writers

Lists of writers